This is a list of the Honduras national football team results from 2020 to 2029.

2020
Honduras was scheduled to begin playing in 2020 in the CONCACAF Nations League Finals.  However, the games were postponed until 2021 due to the COVID-19 pandemic.

2021

2022

2023

Record
Record does not include matches against clubs or teams not affiliated to FIFA.
 As of 30 October 2022

References

2020s